Leslie Ann Kolodziejski (born July 31, 1958) is an American professor of electrical engineering at the Massachusetts Institute of Technology. She works on fabricating novel photonic devices after synthesizing the constituent material via molecular-beam epitaxy. She is a recipient of the Presidential Young Investigator Award from the National Science Foundation and is a fellow of The Optical Society.

Early life and education 
Kolodziejski earned her undergraduate and graduate degrees at Purdue University, completing her bachelor's degree in 1983 and Master's in 1984. She received her Ph.D. from Purdue University in 1986, where she worked on molecular-beam epitaxy.

Research and career 
Kolodziejski joined the Electrical and Computer Engineering Department at Purdue University as an assistant professor in 1986. She was awarded the National Science Foundation Presidential Young Investigator Award from 1987 to 1993 for researching potential uses of molecular-beam epitaxy with photo-excitation, for designing more efficient doping processes of zinc selenide and for studying the resulting product's properties. A simultaneous United States Naval Research Laboratory Fellowship was awarded in 1989 to determine the optimum growth parameters for the chemical beam epitaxy of zinc selenide and comparing the product specifications with that obtained via molecular beam epitaxy.

She moved to the Massachusetts Institute of Technology (MIT) in 1988 to continue to work on epitaxial deposition. In 1992, Kolodziejski was appointed to the Karl van Tassel Career Development Chair and in 1993, to the Esther and Harold E. Edgerton Career Development Chair. Kolodziejski was made full Professor in the faculty of Electrical Engineering and Computer Science (EECS) in 1999, where she currently teaches at both undergraduate and postgraduate level while leading the Integrated Photonic Devices and Materials Group and the Nanoprecision Deposition Laboratory.

Academic service 
Kolodziejski has served on the editorial boards of Applied Physics Letters and the Journal of Applied Physics. She is a member of the Truth Values Community, which looks to create a better community for women graduate students at MIT through a pairing of science and arts. She is also the founder of Leaders in Life, an organization which works to foster leadership among women graduate students.

In 2015, Kolodziejski was awarded an Alfred P. Sloan Foundation award to create a University Centre of Exemplary Mentoring. She is also a mentor for the Minority PhD program (MPhD).

Awards and honors 
In 2011, Kolodziejski was elected as a fellow of The Optical Society. She was the recipient of the Faculty Ambassador Award, which recognizes "enhancing the experience for students at MIT that transcends the boundaries of the classroom" as well as enthusiastic support for multiculturalism and diversity. Other awards and recognition include:

 Office of Naval Research, Young Investigator Award
 National Science Foundation, Presidential Young Investigator Award

Selected publications

See also

 John Joannopoulos, fellow MIT physicist and collaborator of Kolodziejski's
 List of emerging material science technologies
 List of Massachusetts Institute of Technology faculty
 Materials science
 Women in physics

References

External links
 
 Academic Interviews and Offers Panel Discussion, featuring Leslie Kolodziejski and others, from the Massachusetts Institute of Technology, via YouTube

Purdue University College of Engineering alumni
Purdue University faculty
American women physicists
MIT School of Engineering faculty
American women engineers
1958 births
Living people
Fellows of Optica (society)
20th-century women engineers
21st-century women engineers
21st-century American physicists
20th-century American physicists
Academic journal editors
Women in optics
Optical engineers
American women academics
20th-century American women scientists
21st-century American women scientists